Sri Krishnadevaraya University is a public university in Anantapur, Andhra Pradesh, India, founded on 25 July 1981. The university is named after a patron of learning and the arts, Sri Krishnadevaraya, of the Vijayanagara empire of the 16th century.

History

The university is an offshoot of the erstwhile Postgraduate Centre of Sri Venkateswara University started in 1968. Subsequently, in 1976, the SVU Postgraduate Centre attained autonomous status. Its Vice-Chancellor for the first two terms was M. Abel (1981–87).

In 1987, with a capital outlay of Rs. 1.2 crores, Sri Krishnadevaraya Institute of Management was started with funding from the UGC. In 1988, the university which was originally a unitary, residential institution, became a full-fledged affiliating university. The Postgraduate Centre at Kurnool under the jurisdiction of Sri Venkateswara University was made over to Sri Krishnadevaraya University in 1993. Sri Krishnadevaraya University College of Engineering & Technology was started in 2006 with self-finance.

Campus

Academic programs
The library has back volumes on the stacks numbering 13,600.  There is one SC/ST Book Bank, INFLIBNET facility, and software for University Libraries (SOUL).

Sri Krishnadevaraya University has been offering Ph.D, M.Phil, Post Graduating and Under Graduating courses through affiliated colleges besides of university.

References

External links
 

Universities in Andhra Pradesh
Universities and colleges in Anantapur district
Educational institutions established in 1981
1981 establishments in Andhra Pradesh